Zentene Parish is an administrative unit of Tukums Municipality in the Courland region of Latvia.

Towns, villages and settlements of Zentene parish

References 

Parishes of Latvia
Tukums Municipality
Courland